Sigurd Høst (22 January 1866 – 21 August 1939) was a Norwegian educationalist and textbook writer.

Biography
Høst was born in Flora to physician Ude Jacob Høst (1834-1918) and Lorentze Schulrud (1837–99). 
He graduated as philologist in 1891, and worked as teacher and lecture at several private schools in Kristiania (now Oslo). He served as headmaster of the Bergen Cathedral School from 1907, and of the Christiania Cathedral School from 1915. From 1921 to 1922 he lectured at the University of Sorbonne in Paris, and from 1923 to 1926 he lectured at the University of Oslo.

His textbooks Lærebog i fransk for begyndere from 1896 and Franske læsestykker for gymnasiet from 1897 were used in secondary schools for more than fifty years. He also wrote Lærebok i verdenshistorie for middelskolen from 1909, a textbook in world history which saw long-term use. Høst is also known as friend and early sales agent for the painters Nikolai Astrup and Edvard Munch.

Personal life
In 1897, he married Isabella Alver Vibe (1870–1937). He received the King's Medal of Merit (Kongens fortjenstmedalje) in gold in 1912.
He was the father of philologist and literary historian Gunnar Høst and stepfather of writer Inger Alver Gløersen.

References

1866 births
1939 deaths
People from Flora, Norway
Norwegian educators
Heads of schools in Norway
Academic staff of the University of Paris
Academic staff of the University of Oslo
Norwegian expatriates in France
Recipients of the King's Medal of Merit